The 1977 Bogra mutiny was a mutiny in Bogra Cantonment on 30 September 1977.

Background
Ziaur Rahman was the chief of Army Staff, he served as the chief Martial law administrator after the Assassination of Sheikh Mujibur Rahman. On 21 April 1977 President Abu Sadat Mohammad Sayem resigned and Zia became president of Bangladesh. 

In July 1977 the Bogra cantonment saw another mutiny which led to the mutinous unit being disbanded. The cause behind the mutiny was resentment over pay increase which were deemed insufficient.

Events
The mutiny took place in Bogra cantonment under the leadership of Lieutenant Colonel Zaman. The government of Bangladesh was preoccupied with Japan Airlines Flight 472 which was hijacked and had landed in Dhaka. Enlisted men had killed their officers and there were reports of gunfire in Bogra town. The 22nd Bengal Regiment had mutinied. After the mutiny had failed, hundreds of soldiers were executed and buried in mass graves in Rajshahi.

References

1977 crimes in Bangladesh
Conflicts in 1977
1977
Murder in Bangladesh
Mutinies
Military history of Bangladesh
History of Bangladesh (1971–present)
1970s in Dhaka
1977 in military history
Military coups in Bangladesh
September 1977 events in Asia
1970s coups d'état and coup attempts
Bogura District